Ebinania is a  genus of marine ray-finned fishes belonging to the family Psychrolutidae, the fatheads. These fishes are found in the Southern, Indian, Pacific and Atlantic Oceans.

Species
There are currently seven recognized species in this genus:
 Ebinania australiae Jackson & J. S. Nelson, 2006
 Ebinania brephocephala (D. S. Jordan & Starks, 1903)
 Ebinania costaecanariae (Cervigón, 1961)
 Ebinania gyrinoides (M. C. W. Weber, 1913)
 Ebinania macquariensis J. S. Nelson, 1982 (Macquarie blobfish)
 Ebinania malacocephala J. S. Nelson, 1982
 Ebinania vermiculata Sakamoto, 1932

References

Psychrolutidae